Events in the year 2021 in Mauritius.

Incumbents

 President: Prithvirajsing Roopun
 Prime Minister: Pravind Jugnauth

Events
Ongoing — COVID-19 pandemic in Mauritius

Deaths

April

10 April – Édouard Maunick, 89, poet (born 1931).

June

3 June – Sir Anerood Jugnauth, 2nd Prime Minister and 4th President of Mauritius (b. 1930)

References

 
2020s in Mauritius
Years of the 21st century in Mauritius
Mauritius
Mauritius